Official Bootleg V.1 is the first CD release by the 21st Century Schizoid Band. It features the band playing in the studio songs they had previously performed in King Crimson.

Track list
 "A Man a City" (Robert Fripp, Pete Sinfield, McDonald, Greg Lake, Giles) 8:25
 "Catfood" (Fripp, Sinfield, McDonald) 4:50
 "In the Court of the Crimson King" (McDonald, Sinfield) 7:26
 "Formentera Lady" (Fripp, Sinfield) 12:42
 "Ladies of the Road" (Fripp, Sinfield) 7:14
 "I Talk to the Wind" (McDonald, Sinfield) 5:23
 "21st Century Schizoid Man" (Fripp, McDonald, Lake, Giles, Sinfield) 7:37

Personnel
Jakko Jakszyk: guitar, lead vocals
Ian McDonald: saxophones, backing vocals, flute, keyboards
Mel Collins: saxophones, backing vocals, flute, keyboards
Peter Giles: bass, backing vocals
Michael Giles: drums

References

21st Century Schizoid Band albums
2002 live albums